Dekeidoryxis khooi is a moth of the family Gracillariidae. It is known from Perak, Malaysia.

The wingspan is 5.2–6.7 mm.

The larvae feed on Maesa ramentacea. They probably mine the leaves of their host plant.

Etymology
This species is named in honour of Dr. Khoo Soo Ghee of the Zoological Department of the University of Malaya.

References

Acrocercopinae
Moths described in 1989